Jack Lewis may refer to:

Authors
 Jack Lewis (screenwriter) (1924–2009), American screenwriter, stuntman, and U.S. Marine
 Jack Lewis (author) (born 1964), American author and Motorcyclist magazine columnist

Sports
 Jack Lewis (baseball) (1884–1956), American player
 Jack Lewis (equestrian) (born 1902), Irish Olympic equestrian
 Jack Lewis (footballer, born 1902) (1902–?), Welsh footballer who played for Cardiff City and Newport County
 Jack Lewis (footballer, born 1912) (1912–?), Welsh footballer who played for Stoke City
 Jack Lewis (footballer, born 1919) (1919–2002), English footballer who played for Crystal Palace, Bournemouth and Reading
 Jack Lewis (footballer, born 1948), Wales under-23 international footballer who played for Grimsby Town
 Jackie Lewis (born 1936), British racing driver

Other
 Jack Windsor Lewis (1926–2021), British phonetician
 Jack Lewis, Baron Lewis of Newnham (1928–2014), English chemist
 Jack P. Lewis (born 1919), American Bible scholar
 Jack Lewis (musician) (born 1980), American musician
 Jack Patrick Lewis (born 1984), American politician
 Jack Clark Lewis (1935-2022), President and CEO of Amdahl Corporation

See also
John Lewis (disambiguation)